Curtis William "Curt" Anderson (born June 6, 1984) is an American Christian musician and worship leader, who primarily plays Christian pop and contemporary worship music. He has released one studio album, Every Moment, in 2016, with Dream Records.

Early and personal life
Anderson was born Curtis William Anderson, on June 6, 1984, in Iowa City, Iowa, the son of William and Robyn Anderson (née, Olsen), soon moved to Pittsburgh, Pennsylvania where his family is from, though he spent most of his formative years in Ithaca, Michigan, where he graduated from Ithaca High School. He attended Anderson University in Anderson, Indiana, where he studied music business. He moved to Nashville, Tennessee to pursue his music career in 2009. Anderson is married to Brittney Anderson, and they have two children together.

Music career
He started recording music in 2002 while in high school, selling a one-take homemade CD to classmates, and soon after started performing under the name No Greater Sky, releasing an album titled Hearts & Stars in 2006. Anderson says he wanted people to more easily connect, so he dropped the No Greater Sky name and began using his own name as a solo artist. He signed a licensing deal with Dream Records in 2015 and had his first international release in 2016 with the studio album Every Moment, released on January 15, 2016. His songs "Keep it Beating" and "Every Moment" were released as singles to Christian and mixed-format radio internationally. Both songs were among the highest played songs of 2016 in Australia and other countries. Anderson's music can also be heard on in-store radio in over 32,000 retail stores, including Walgreens and Kroger brands.

Anderson told Hallels his inspiration for the music on the album is that people hear about the love Jesus Christ has for them. In an interview with Michigan newspaper The Morning Sun, Anderson said, "I love people and I think music is the vehicle God gave me to be able to love people and impact them in some way."

In April 2018, Anderson released Every Moment Vol. II, which includes the singles "Keep Me Falling" and "Love Like You Love". Both singles saw significant airplay on Christian radio internationally, earning the No. 14 and No. 76 spots on the TCM Top 100 songs of 2018 in Australia. Each of his singles has spent over 25 weeks in the TCM Top 30 in Australia.

He has written songs for other artists, including KJ-52, Tricia Brock of Superchick, and Satellites & Sirens.

Curt Anderson is a true global ambassador of music. His touring has taken him to nearly 60 countries, had him on radio and tv shows around the world, and also given him the opportunity to perform at the US Capitol.

Discography
Studio albums
 Every Moment (January 15, 2016, Dream)
 Every Moment Vol. II (April 2, 2018, Independent)

References

External links
 Official website

1984 births
Living people
American performers of Christian music
Musicians from Michigan
Songwriters from Michigan
Musicians from Nashville, Tennessee
People from Ithaca, Michigan
Songwriters from Tennessee